Dražen Gović (29 April 1981 – 16 February 2022) was a Croatian professional footballer who played as a midfielder.

Club career 
Gović began his career in 2000 with NK Mosor in the Croatian Second Football League. In 2002, he played in the highest level of football in Croatia in the Croatian First Football League with NK Zadar. In 2004, he signed with HNK Šibenik and played a total of 63 matches and recorded 12 goals. He had a stint with R.E. Mouscron in Belgium, and went overseas to play with Brunei DPMM FC in the S.League. In 2010, he went to Canada to sign with Brantford Galaxy of the Canadian Soccer League. On 5 July 2010, he was transferred back to Šibenik in order to assist the club in their UEFA Europa League run.

Personal life and death 
He died in a car accident near Šibenik on 16 February 2022, at the age of 40.

References

External links
 

1981 births
2022 deaths
Sportspeople from Šibenik
Association football midfielders
Croatian footballers
NK Mosor players
NK Zadar players
HNK Šibenik players
Royal Excel Mouscron players
DPMM FC players
Brantford Galaxy players
First Football League (Croatia) players
Croatian Football League players
Belgian Pro League players
Singapore Premier League players
Canadian Soccer League (1998–present) players
Croatian expatriate footballers
Expatriate footballers in Belgium
Croatian expatriate sportspeople in Belgium
Expatriate footballers in Brunei
Croatian expatriate sportspeople in Brunei
Expatriate soccer players in Canada
Croatian expatriate sportspeople in Canada
Road incident deaths in Croatia